The 1948–49 season was the forty-seventh season in which Dundee competed at a Scottish national level, playing in Division A. In one of the club's most impressive seasons in its history, Dundee would lead the league going into the final day, but a loss to Falkirk and title rivals Rangers defeating Albion Rovers resulted in Dundee finishing 2nd, just 1 point behind Rangers. Striker Alex Stott would top the Division A scoring charts with 30 league goals, and would score 39 goals in all competitions.

Dundee would also compete in both the Scottish Cup and the Scottish League Cup. Continuing their impressive season, Dundee would reach the Semi-finals of both competitions, but would fall to Rangers in the League Cup and to Clyde in a replay in the Scottish Cup.

Scottish Division A 

Statistics provided by Dee Archive.

League table

Scottish League Cup 

Statistics provided by Dee Archive.

Group 2

Group 2 table

Knockout stage

Scottish Cup 

Statistics provided by Dee Archive.

Player Statistics 
Statistics provided by Dee Archive

|}

See also 

 List of Dundee F.C. seasons

References

External links 

 1948-49 Dundee season on Fitbastats

Dundee F.C. seasons
Dundee